Able is an extinct town in Bent County, in the U.S. state of Colorado. The GNIS classifies it as a populated place.

History
Able was founded ca. 1924 at the site once also known as the "Martin" railroad stop.

References

Geography of Bent County, Colorado
Ghost towns in Colorado